The 2020 New Zealand cannabis referendum was a non-binding referendum held on 17 October 2020 in conjunction with the 2020 general election and a euthanasia referendum, on the question of whether to legalise the sale, use, possession and production of recreational cannabis. It was rejected by New Zealand voters. The form of the referendum was a vote for or against the proposed "Cannabis Legalisation and Control Bill". Official results were released by the Electoral Commission on 6 November 2020 with 50.7% of voters opposing the legalisation and 48.4% in support.

The results of the cannabis referendum would not have affected the legal status of medicinal cannabis or licensed hemp production, both of which were already legal. They would also not have affected laws regarding driving under the influence of drugs, or workplace health and safety (e.g. being under the influence of cannabis at work).

Background 
Cannabis has been illegal in New Zealand since 1927. Historically, neither of the two biggest political parties in New Zealand, Labour or National have tried to decriminalise or legalise cannabis. The Green Party, which has advocated for drug law reform for many years, secured a commitment to hold a referendum after the 2017 election as part of its confidence and supply agreement with Labour. This agreement followed statements made by the Green Party in December 2016, that if it formed a government in the 2017 election it would legalise the personal production and possession of cannabis for personal use.

In May 2019, a background cabinet paper outlining the options that had been considered for the referendum and the draft legislation was released. The referendum was announced and defended as "binding" by prime minister Jacinda Ardern and justice minister Andrew Little, but as it would not be "self-executing," the bill would still have had to pass a vote in parliament if the referendum returned a "yes" result. Legally the referendum was non-binding and the proposed bill could have been changed in any way before becoming law.

Cannabis laws 

Possession of any amount of recreational cannabis is illegal in New Zealand. Cannabis use is controlled under the Misuse of Drugs Act 1975 and the maximum sentence for possession of cannabis is 3 months' imprisonment or a $500 fine; although there is a preference against imprisonment. The presumption of supply threshold is 28 grams or 100 joints; above this threshold it is presumed any cannabis possessed is for supply. Cultivation of cannabis carries a maximum penalty of 7 years' imprisonment, while dealing of cannabis carries a maximum penalty of 8 years' imprisonment. Per the tariff case R v Terewi [1999], cultivating cannabis for personal use warrants a community sentence or, if there are aggravating factors, a short-term prison sentence.

The Misuse of Drugs Amendment Act 2019 became law on 13 August 2019 and affirmed existing Police discretion of whether prosecution or a health approach is preferable for personal drug possession and use.

Medicinal use 
On 1 April 2020, Misuse of Drugs (Medicinal Cannabis) Regulations 2019 came into effect. This enabled the approval of prescription medicinal psychoactive cannabis products that previously were unavailable, and also the licensing of commercial cultivation of cannabis plants for medicinal use.
Approved cannabis-based pharmaceuticals can be prescribed by a specialist doctor, but require patients to meet strict criteria. Prior to the referendum, only Sativex was approved for use in New Zealand. Sativex is not subsidised, so patients must pay the full retail cost. In 2020 the Medicinal Cannabis Scheme significantly modified medicinal access to psychoactive cannabis products, and in March 2021 two new cannabidiol drugs were certified for minimum quality standards.

Terminally ill patients have had a legal defence against prosecution for possessing and consuming cannabis under the Misuse of Drugs (Medicinal Cannabis) Amendment Act since December 2018.

Referendum structure 

In May 2020 the final legislation was made available and it was confirmed that the question put to voters would be:
Do you support the proposed Cannabis Legalisation and Control Bill?

The two options were: 
 "Yes, I support the proposed Cannabis Legalisation and Control Bill" and
"No, I do not support the proposed Cannabis Legalisation and Control Bill".

Proposed bill 
If passed into law unchanged, the proposed "Cannabis Legalisation and Control Bill" would have served as new regulatory framework for the production, sale, purchase and consumption of non-medical cannabis in New Zealand. A new regulatory body, the Cannabis Regulatory Authority would have been established with the primary objectives of promoting the well-being of New Zealanders, reducing cannabis-related harm and reducing the overall use of cannabis over time.

The proposed Bill included provisions for the following:
 Minimum purchase and possession age of 20 years old
 Allowing an eligible person to purchase and possess up to 14 grams of dried cannabis (or its equivalent) per day
 Allowing each eligible person to grow up to two cannabis plants for personal use on their own property, up to a maximum of four plants per household
 A ban on marketing and advertising cannabis products
 Requirement to include harm minimisation messaging on cannabis products
 Confining use to private homes and licensed premises, and only in compliance with the Smoke-free Environments Act 1990
 Limiting the sale of recreational cannabis to physical stores (i.e. no remote or online sales)
 Control over the potency of recreational cannabis being sold
 State licensing regime for recreational cannabis
 Applying an excise tax and a harm-reduction levy to cannabis products (in addition to the 15% GST which applies to all goods sold in New Zealand)
 Establishing the Cannabis Regulatory Authority to license and authorise supply
The full text of the bill was available, along with a guide, from the New Zealand government's referendums website.

Public opinion 
Many polling organisations asked New Zealanders questions related to cannabis legislation. The results were inconsistent, with "different companies producing wildly different results". However, every poll showed a clear split along age lines. Voters aged 18 to 29, Green and Labour party supporters and Māori people were more likely to support cannabis legalisation, while voters aged 50 and over and National party supporters were more likely to oppose cannabis legalisation.

Overall, support for decriminalisation reached a peak of around 65% three years before the referendum, but declined from 54% in February 2020 to around 45% in polls taken a month or so before the referendum. A 2020 study of Twitter users who tweeted about cannabis between July 2009 to August 2020 found that 62% had a positive view of cannabis, with tweets in 2020 having a slightly higher proportion of positive views on cannabis (65.3%), while 53.5% of those who talked about the cannabis referendum were in support of the bill.

Most polling conducted prior to September 2020 asked about opinions on the legalisation of cannabis for personal use, or in some cases, about government control of use and sale of cannabis, rather than about the Legalisation and Control Bill, which was released for public consultation in May 2020. Polls asking about the specific bill showed mixed opinion, from 35% for / 53% against to 49% for / 45% against.

Opinion poll numbers tend to trend higher around support for medicinal use of cannabis. When voting age New Zealanders were asked in July 2017 if they supported "growing and/or using cannabis for medical reasons if you have a terminal illness", 59% responded that it should be legal, 22% supported decriminalisation, while 15% responded it should be illegal. However, when they were asked their thoughts on "Possessing a small amount of cannabis for personal use", 37% responded that it should be decriminalised, 31% responded that it should be illegal, and 28% responded that it should be fully legal.

Polling

Debate 

Leading up to the referendum, much media attention was paid to the upcoming vote, and to arguments for and against the legalisation of cannabis in New Zealand. Proponents of the bill focused largely on the inefficacy of prohibition, and the prevalence of black market cannabis in New Zealand, while opponents argued that the legislation would allow greater access to the drug, especially for children.

Arguments for reform

Prohibition being ineffective 
The New Zealand Drug Foundation (NZDF), a pro-reform charitable trust, said that 80% of New Zealanders have tried cannabis by age 21, but only 10% of the population become heavy users. The NZDF reported that New Zealanders consume around 74 tonnes of cannabis a year, and that each year, the New Zealand Police spend over 330,000 hours on cannabis enforcement which costs the taxpayer almost $200 million. NZDF suggested that legalisation would free up police to focus on more serious drug crimes.

Disproportionate impact on Māori 
The NZDF also argued that there is a significant underground market for cannabis and that prohibition disproportionately criminalizes Māori. According to the NZDF, Māori are three times more likely to get a cannabis conviction than non-Māori for the same level of cannabis use, are twice as likely as non-Māori to suffer a substance use disorder and find it harder to access health and treatment services. The NZDF suggested that Cannabis Legalisation and Control Bill would largely eliminate the black market for cannabis and reduce the number of young Māori receiving convictions by enabling Māori participation in a regulated legal market, and providing for Māori representation on the body charged with developing national cannabis policy.

It was independently reported that 79% of Māori supported the Bill.

Employment & tax intake 
Studies conducted by independent consultancy Business and Economic Research Limited indicate the annual tax intake from cannabis, if it was legalised, would be more than $1 billion. The NZDF suggested that this money could be put into healthcare (including more addiction treatment facilities), schools, education programmes and other infrastructure that will benefit all New Zealanders. The cannabis industry could employ about 5000 people and allow the government to regulate and tax the sale and distribution.

Arguments against reform

Use by children 

Opponents of the bill suggested that despite an age limit on legal cannabis trade, children would be influenced by new legal and social norms, and, similar to alcohol and cigarettes, a greater prevalence of the drug would lead to cannabis use at younger ages than the legislation regulates for. In Oregon, where cannabis has been legalised, the number of children younger than six reported poisoned by cannabis rose by 271 per cent (from 14 cases to 52). Concerns were also expressed that government and authorities were not able to control underage access and use of alcohol and vaping products, so were unlikely to be able to control illegal cannabis use.
 
The age at which people start using cannabis is an important factor, and use of the drug can affect brain development in teenagers. A New Zealand study found that heavy use by teens led to an average loss of eight IQ points between ages 13 and 38. Even if these individuals quit as adults, lost mental abilities didn't fully return. Those who started smoking cannabis as adults didn't show notable IQ declines. Frequent use in early teens also doubles the risk of developing schizophrenia in the future.

Increase in use 
The Smart Approaches to Marijuana NZ Coalition, and the Say Nope to Dope campaign, suggest that the introduction of a legal market would lead to competition with the existing black market and drive cannabis prices down. The group suggested that this would lead to an increase in cannabis use overall, an outcome that is counter to the purpose of the bill: reducing harm.

Road and workplace accidents 
Concerns were also been raised that if more people start smoking it, this might lead to more road accidents and workplace injuries. Research in New Zealand showed that regular cannabis users have ten times the risk of car crash injuries or death compared to non-users, with another study showing that more than half of drivers causing a crash had drugs in their system.

Impact on health 
Opponents to the bill emphasised that cannabis smoke irritates the lungs, and people who smoke it frequently can have the similar breathing problems to those who smoke tobacco. These problems include daily cough and phlegm, more frequent lung illness, and a higher risk of lung infections. A succession of clinical studies have found it increases the risk of chronic bronchitis, inflammation of the throat, and impaired immune function. However, it has not been shown to cause lung cancer. Cannabis may also precipitate schizophrenia in individuals who are vulnerable because of a personal or family history of schizophrenia.

Campaigning and endorsements 

The rules regarding campaigning for the referendum were generally the same as for the general election. All advertisements had to carry a promoter statement, stating the name and physical address of the promoter. It was illegal to campaign on polling day, or within a 10-metre radius of an advance polling booth.

During the regulated period, which ran from 18 August to 16 October 2020, promoters had to declare their campaign expenses and there were limits on how much they could spend on referendum campaigning. The maximum expense limit was $338,000 per referendum for those promoters registered with the Electoral Commission, and $13,600 per referendum for unregistered promoters.

There were 15 registered promoters for the 2020 General Election and Referendums, two of which were against recreational cannabis: Family First New Zealand and SAM (Smart Approaches to Marijuana) NZ Coalition and 13 were in support. The Helen Clark Foundation was not registered, but was influential in the lead up to the election.

On 30 June 2020, minister of justice Andrew Little claimed SAM NZ's campaign was funded by US political organisation Smart Approaches to Marijuana (SAM), via Family First, however SAM NZ state they are fully funded by concerned New Zealand families and did not receive any funding from the US organisation.

The New Zealand Medical Association initially announced its opposition to the legislation, although controversy around a lack of membership consultation led the board to retract their public stance. The NZMA originally stated that "cannabis is a harmful drug that causes a range of health and social harms at the individual and community level", however it was subsequently revealed that the NZMA relied on outdated information and had not consulted any of its 5,000 doctors before making their statement public. Many GPs were upset by this and, subsequently, more than 100 doctors publicly supported cannabis legalisation. Dr Emma Clare said many doctors thought the referendum would pass, and so did not speak up about the NZMA's anti legislation stance. The NZMA was also criticised by former prime minister Helen Clark, who said it had given "a false impression to voters of what doctors think". Less than two weeks before election day, when early voting had been going on for over a week, the NZMA sent a letter of apology to its members which said: "The NZMA will have no position regarding the cannabis referendum."

While the government claimed to not have a position on the legalisation of cannabis, opponents of the proposed bill criticised government-published information for bias and lobbying for law change. The New Zealand Medical Journal was critical of the government naming and promoting the proposed bill as planning to "reduce harm", because evidence on outcomes were inconclusive, as legalisation was a still new model. The government was also criticised for not releasing an assessment report of the potential effects of legalisation, until after voting had begun.

The government-funded NZ Drug Foundation claimed to be apolitical, but was accused of misleading advertising, saying the proposed bill would improve access to medicinal cannabis, when the proposed bill did not include medicinal cannabis.

Close to the election, The Spinoff said Family First's "Say Nope To Dope" and SAM-NZ's "Vote Nope To Dope" campaigns had "out-worked and out-messaged pro-legalisation campaigners", observing "one team just wanting it more".

Much media attention was given to the fact that prime minister Jacinda Ardern would neither endorse, nor reveal her personal stance on the referendum. In May 2020 Jacinda Ardern polled as New Zealand's most popular prime minister in a century, thanks in part to her success in dealing with the COVID-19 pandemic. Speculation prior to the election held that an endorsement from Ardern, would likely sway the outcome of the referendum, but despite publicly endorsing a Yes vote for the euthanasia referendum, she did not share her position on the cannabis referendum. Ardern stated that she wanted New Zealanders to form their own views on the matter, and that the Labour Party also held no official position.

Professor Papaarangi Reid, head of the department of Māori health at the University of Auckland, suggested the legislation would have helped regulate its strength, its cost and limit its accessibility by young people.

Supported Yes vote

Individuals 
 Israel Adesanya
 Helen Clark, former Prime Minister of New Zealand (1999–2008)
 Dr Hinemoa Elder, New Zealand youth forensic psychiatrist
Abe Gray, founder of the Whakamana Cannabis Museum and high-profile cannabis activist and protester.
Andrew Little, Labour Party MP and former Minister of Justice
 Shai Navot, then deputy leader of The Opportunities Party (TOP)
 Diane Robertson
 Chlöe Swarbrick, Green Party MP
 Tiki Taane
 Topp Twins
 Sam Neill
 Paul Wieland, consultant anaesthetist at Southland hospital.

Organisations 
 The Helen Clark Foundation. In September 2019, the Foundation issued a report analysing the impact of the current law and supporting legalisation.
 New Zealand Drug Foundation
 NORML New Zealand
 JustSpeak, a youth-focused group which advocates for criminal justice reform
 ActionStation Aotearoa
 Victoria University of Wellington Students Association. VUWSA endorsed a Yes vote after 75 per cent of students voted in favour at the annual association referendum.

Political parties 
 Aotearoa Legalise Cannabis Party
 Green Party
 The Opportunities Party (TOP)

Supported No vote

Individuals 
 Paula Bennett, former Deputy Prime Minister of New Zealand (2016–17)
 Simeon Brown, National Party MP
Eroni Clarke
Efeso Collins
 Judith Collins, then National Party Leader and Leader of the Opposition (2020–2021)
Patrick Drumm, Mount Albert Grammar School Principal
 James Farmer, Queen's Counsel
Kate Hawkesby
 Mike Hosking
 Aaron Ironside, SAM NZ Spokesperson, counsellor, pastor and broadcaster.
John Key, former Prime Minister of New Zealand (2008–2016)
 Jo Luxton, Labour Party candidate for Rangitata
 Dr Muriel Newman, former ACT New Zealand politician
 Wynton Rufer
Nick Smith, National Party MP
David Tua

Organisations 
 Family First New Zealand
 The Salvation Army agreed with the need for decriminalisation but did not support the legalisation of cannabis as proposed in the referendum.
 SAM (Smart Approaches to Marijuana) NZ Coalition, a collective of more than 25 groups and individuals, including drug addiction and testing services, the Sensible Sentencing Trust, family organisations, and faith-based organisations like the NZ Christian Network, the New Zealand Muslim Association, and Foundation for a Drug-Free World, a division of the Church of Scientology.

Political parties 
 New Zealand National Party caucus
 New Conservative Party

Results 

Official results for the general election and referendums were released on 6 November 2020. The number opposed to decriminalisation was 50.7% with 48.4% in favour. Preliminary results for the referendums were released by the Electoral Commission on 30 October 2020. Those results had 53.5% of people opposed to the legislation with 46.5% in support. Around 480,000 special votes were counted later reducing the percentage opposed to 50.7%.

Unlike the general election, a preliminary count for the cannabis and euthanasia referendums was not completed on election night (17 October). All voting papers, counterfoils and electoral rolls were returned to the electorate's returning officer for counting. During the count, the returning officer approved and counted any special votes, and compiled a master electoral roll to ensure no-one voted more than once. Special votes include votes from those who enrolled after the deadline of 13 September, those who voted outside their electorate (including overseas votes), voters in hospital or prison, and those voters enrolled on the unpublished roll. To simplify processing and counting, overseas votes were sent to and counted at the Electoral Commission's central processing centre in Wellington.

By polling place location 
As each polling place had only one ballot box for ordinary referendum votes, ordinary votes were broken down by the general electorate where the polling place was located. Special votes were broken down by electorate. Both ordinary and special votes have been combined in the following table.

Response
Green Party MP Chlöe Swarbrick, a campaigner for drug reform, sarcastically told the winning No campaigners "Well done. It [cannabis] still exists" and said she would continue her fight for legalising cannabis. She labelled as hypocrites the majority of parliamentarians, who refused to publicly state they supported legalisation.

After preliminary results for the referendum were released, prime minister Jacinda Ardern revealed that she had voted Yes in the referendum, and subsequently faced criticism, with Swarbrick suggesting that Ardern's refusal to offer public support showed she was not willing to stand up for her convictions. Aaron Ironside, spokesperson for SAM-NZ (who endorsed a "No" vote), agreed that Ardern's silence contributed to the result and said she had done the right thing letting voters decide, as that was the point of the referendum.

National MP Nick Smith described the preliminary result as a "victory for common sense" and that New Zealanders had "signalled opposition to the softening of drug crime". Family First director Bob McCoskrie of the "Say Nope to Dope" campaign said that he was "pretty stoked" with the preliminary referendum results and that  New Zealanders "understood the perceived benefits of legalisation were not greater than the harms that were going to come on society". Ironside said that he was happy that New Zealand younger people would not be enlisted in a "social experiment."

Writing on Stuff, columnist Damien Grant pointed out that previous governments had ignored referendum results and thought the new Labour government should do the same. He said: "Not only is the idea that the electorate should decide any particular issue impracticable, the closeness of the cannabis vote means that the prohibition of the drug is now unworkable" and argued that parliament should, "consider the ethical merits of subjecting the minority of otherwise law-abiding citizens to criminal sanctions for smoking dried leaves at the behest of a puritan majority".

Parmjit Randhawa, director of Christchurch-based medicinal cannabis company Greenlab was glad the referendum didn't pass as he didn't think there was enough clinical evidence supporting recreational cannabis. Speaking of research and development into medicinal cannabis he said "Before we start running, we should start walking."

Victoria University Associate Professor, Dr Fiona Hutton, said she thought the No campaign advertisements were "based on outdated moralised notions of those who use drugs, influenced by rightwing religious groups from the US". Hutton also thought "the playing field was never level, [and] that absolutely fantastic academics, community groups, organisations and campaigners [...] sought to educate, to inform, to circulate evidence, to give people clear and balanced information, fought to get their voices heard amongst swirling misinformation and misdirection".

NewstalkZB radio broadcaster Mike Hosking spoke about research showing the media bias in favour of the Yes campaigners, saying "36 percent of all headlines promoted yes, 18 percent were for no. In other words, twice as much of what you saw was for one camp." Similarly figures on the number of reported quotes from advocates showed "the yes position was quoted twice as often as no". He said "worst offenders were The Spinoff, Stuff, Newshub, the Herald, TVNZ, and Radio New Zealand" and that he thought TVNZ & RNZ had "a statutory obligation to be fair and balanced".

Notes

References

External links
 
 Proposed Cannabis Legalisation and Control Bill 
 Office of the Prime Minister's Chief Science Advisor cannabis information website

New Zealand referendum
Cannabis referendum
2020 referendums
2020 referendum
Cannabis referendum
2020 cannabis
Referendums postponed due to the COVID-19 pandemic